The 1996 "M" Electronika Cup was a women's tennis tournament played on outdoor clay courts in Bol in Croatia that was part of Tier IV of the 1996 WTA Tour. It was the third edition of the tournament and was held from 29 April until 5 May 1996. Unseeded Gloria Pizzichini won the singles title.

Finals

Singles

 Gloria Pizzichini defeated  Silvija Talaja 6–0, 6–2
 It was Pizzichini's only singles title of her career.

Doubles

 Laura Montalvo /  Paola Suárez defeated  Alexia Dechaume-Balleret /  Alexandra Fusai 6–7, 6–3, 6–4
 It was Montalvo's only title of the year and the 1st of her career. It was Suárez's only title of the year and the 1st of her career.

References

External links
 ITF tournament edition details

M Electronika Cup
Croatian Bol Ladies Open
1996 in Croatian tennis